3-Nitrotoluene or meta-nitrotoluene is an organic compound with the formula .  It is one of three isomers of nitrotoluene.  A yellow liquid, it is used in the manufacture of meta-toluidine, which is an intermediate in the production of various dyes.

Synthesis and reactions
It is made by nitrating toluene.  This reaction mainly affords a 2:1 mixture of 2-nitro and 4-nitro isomers, but after removal of the 2-isomer, the 3-nitrotoluene can be purified by distillation.  It is a precursor to toluidine, which is used in producing azo dyes.

References

External links
CDC - NIOSH Pocket Guide to Chemical Hazards -  m-Nitrotoluene

Nitrotoluenes